Villa Elvira is a district in Argentina, dependent of the La Plata city located in the La Plata Partido of Buenos Aires Province.

References

Populated places in Buenos Aires Province
La Plata Partido